Sumner Lincoln Fairfield (June 25, 1803 – March 6, 1844) was an American poet, born in Warwick, Massachusetts to Dr. Abner Fairfield and Lucy Lincoln. From 1818 to 1820, he studied at Brown University, but he was compelled to leave after 2 years. He taught school in Georgia and South Carolina. In December 1825 he spent 4 months in England and when he returned he married Jane Frazee on September 20, 1826. Sumner had a very sensitive and melancholy personality and according to his wife Jane, "His nature was haughty, unbending, and reserved; he could not brook  personal or newspaper attacks. I have seen him writhe under mental pain even upon a criticism of a poem."

Principal works 
 The Battle of Borodino.  1821
 The Siege of Constantinople A Poem.  1822
 Memoirs of the Life of Mrs. Lucy Fairfield.  1823
 Poems.  1823
 Lays of Melpomene.  1824
 Mina A Dramatic Sketch, with Other Poems.  1825
 The Sisters of St. Clara.  1825
 The Passage of the Sea A Poem : with Other Pieces.  1826
 The Heir of the World, And Lesser Poems.  1829
 Abaddon, the Spirit of Destruction; And Other Poems.  1830
 The Last Night of Pompeii A Poem, and Lays and Legends.  1832
 The Poems and Prose Writings of Sumner Lincoln Fairfield In Two Volumes ; Vol. I.  1841

Notes

References 
Fairfield, Jane Frazee, and Sumner Lincoln Fairfield. The Autobiography of Jane Fairfield; Embracing a Few Select Poems by Sumner Lincoln Fairfield. Boston: Bazin and Ellsworth, 1860.  googlebooks.com Retrieved December 29, 2008
 "Fairfield, Sumner Lincoln" American Authors 1600-1900, The H. W. Wilson Company, 1938
 Hughes, Thomas Patrick, and Frank Munsell. American Ancestry: Giving Name and Descent, in the Male Line, of Americans Whose Ancestors Settled in the United States Previous to the Declaration of Independence, A.D. 1776. (pp. 69–70) Albany, N.Y.: Munsell, 1887. googlebooks Retrieved December 29, 2008

External links
 archive.org

19th-century American poets
American male poets
1803 births
1844 deaths
19th-century American male writers